La Salle, LaSalle or Lasalle is part of the names of two men born in 17th century France, Jean-Baptiste de La Salle and René-Robert Cavelier, Sieur de La Salle, for whom many places and things are named.  The name may refer to:

Places

Canada
La Salle, Manitoba
Ontario
LaSalle, Ontario, a municipality in Essex County
La Salle Township, Ontario, a geographic township in Nipissing District
Quebec
LaSalle, Quebec, a borough of Montreal
LaSalle—Émard, a federal electoral district in Quebec
Lasalle (electoral district), a former electoral district in Quebec

France
 Lasalle, Gard
 La Salle, Saône-et-Loire
 La Salle, Vosges
 La Salle-de-Vihiers, in the Maine-et-Loire department
 La Salle-en-Beaumont, in the Isère department
 La Salle-et-Chapelle-Aubry, in the Maine-et-Loire department
 La Salle-les-Alpes, in the Hautes-Alpes department
 La Salle-Prunet, in the Lozère department

Haiti
La Salle, Grand'Anse, a rural village in the Pestel commune

Italy
La Salle, Aosta Valley

United States
La Salle, Colorado
LaSalle, Illinois
La Salle, Minnesota
La Salle, Texas (disambiguation), multiple locations
LaSalle County, Illinois
La Salle County, Texas
La Salle Parish, Louisiana
LaSalle Park, a neighborhood of St. Louis, Missouri
LaSalle Avenue, San Francisco, California
LaSalle Street, Chicago, Illinois
LaSalle (CTA Blue Line station), on the Chicago Transit Authority's Blue Line
LaSalle/Van Buren (CTA station), on the CTA's Brown, Purple, Pink, and Orange Lines in the Loop
LaSalle Street station, on Metra's Rock Island District
La Salle Township, Michigan
LaSalle (Metro Rail), a Buffalo Metro Rail underground station

Education
La Salle is the name of several educational institutions affiliated with the Institute of the Brothers of the Christian Schools, also known as the Lasallian Brothers, a Roman Catholic religious teaching order founded by French priest Saint Jean-Baptiste de La Salle.
Many institutions are listed in La Sallian educational institutions, De La Salle Supervised Schools, and De La Salle Philippines
Universidad La Salle, in Mexico City, Mexico
Universidad de La Salle, in Bogotá, Colombia
De La Salle Araneta University, in Malabon, Philippines
De La Salle University in Manila, Philippines
La Salle College Antipolo in Antipolo City, Rizal, Philippines
De La Salle University – Dasmariñas, in Cavite, Philippines
La Salle Academy in Manhattan, New York, USA
La Salle Academy, Providence, Rhode Island, USA
La Salle College, Hong Kong
De La Salle - College of Saint Benilde in Taft, Manila, Philippines
La Salle Academy, Utah, USA
La Salle High School Multan in Multan, Pakistan
La Salle University in Philadelphia, Pennsylvania, USA
University of St. La Salle in Bacolod, Philippines
St. Joseph School - La Salle in Bacolod, Philippines
La Salle Green Hills, in Mandaluyong, Philippines
La Salle School, Petaling Jaya, Selangor, Malaysia
La Salle School, Sentul, Kuala Lumpur, Malaysia
La Salle School, Kota Kinabalu, Sabah, Malaysia

La Salle may also refer to:
LASALLE College of the Arts, Singapore
La Salle Extension University, a former correspondence school, Chicago, Illinois, US
LaSalle University (Louisiana), one of the James Kirk diploma mills

Transportation
LaSalle (Amtrak), a Chicago-Milwaukee train operated by Amtrak
LaSalle Expressway, an expressway in Niagara Falls, New York, United States

Other uses 
La Salle (surname)
Asociación de Ex-Alumnos del Colegio de La Salle, an Argentine rugby union team
Lasalle & Koch, sometimes called Lasalle's, a defunct department store in Toledo, Ohio
LaSalle (automobile)
LaSalle County Nuclear Generating Station, in Brookfield Township, Illinois, USA
LaSalle Bank
La Salle Expeditions, expeditions of René-Robert Cavelier, Sieur de La Salle
La Salle Explorers, the athletic program of La Salle University in Philadelphia
LaSalle Hotel (disambiguation)
LaSalle Records, a division of Atlantic Records
La Salle Theater (Chicago)
Jones Lang LaSalle, a financial and professional services company specializing in real estate
LaSalle's invariance principle, a concept in theory of differential equations, with applications in control theory
USS La Salle (AGF-3)
USS La Salle (AP-102)
LaSalle, US band, signed by Thick Records

See also
 LaSalle station (disambiguation)
 De La Salle (disambiguation)
 De La Salle College (disambiguation)
 De La Salle High School (disambiguation)
 La Salle High School (disambiguation)
 La Salle University (disambiguation)
 Laksa, a food item, homophonous to "lasalle" in some Asian languages
 Salle (disambiguation)